The Oceania Handball Champions Cup is an international club championship for men featuring teams from the Oceania region.

The winners of this tournament qualify for the IHF Super Globe (World club championship).

Champions

Club performance

Titles by nations

See also
 Oceania Continent Handball Federation
 Oceania Women's Handball Champions Cup

References

 
Handball competitions in Oceania
Sports club competitions
Recurring sporting events established in 2006
Multi-national professional sports leagues